The Atchison, Topeka and Santa Fe Railway's 3460 class comprised six 4-6-4 "Super Hudson" type steam locomotives built in 1937 by the Baldwin Locomotive Works for service between La Junta, Colorado and Chicago, Illinois, a fairly flat division of the railroad suited for the 4-6-4 type.  They were substantially larger than the road's earlier 3450 class locomotives, and all were built oil-fired, although in a manner that would allow for easy conversion to coal firing. All were fitted with SKF roller bearings on every axle.

They had much in common with the Milwaukee Road's class F7 and the Chicago and North Western Railway's class E-4, all three types being fast, 84-inch drivered 4-6-4s for Midwestern service with 300 lb/in² boiler pressures.

During steeply graded portions of the run it was, of course, assisted by helper locomotives. Such long distance runs were a goal of railway operating departments, enabling a reduction in locomotive numbers and through increased locomotive utilization, reduce overall costs.

The first locomotive, #3460, was built streamlined; painted light, robin's egg blue and silver, it became known as the "Blue Goose".  It was the Santa Fe's only streamlined steam locomotive, featuring extensively in railroad publicity.

Locomotive #3461 was fitted with a streamlined "skyline" casing along the top of the boiler, encasing stack and domes, in an experiment to see if it helped clear smoke away from the locomotive.  It was not retained.  All of the locomotives otherwise had a Santa Fe-style telescoping stack extension fitted, which elongated the stack to clear smoke better and could be lowered to pass under low bridges and tunnels.

The 3460 class 4-6-4s, the 3765 class 4-8-4s, and the 5001 class 2-10-4s were designed and ordered around the same time and had much in common in their designs; in addition, they used the same six-axle tender design.  The classes together were often called the "Big Three".

Only one of this class survives, #3463 was on static display on the grounds to the Southeast of the Kansas Expocentre in Topeka, Kansas. It is planned to be restored to operating condition by the Coalition for Sustainable Rail (CSR).

References 

 
 

3460 class
Baldwin locomotives
4-6-4 locomotives
Railway locomotives introduced in 1937
Steam locomotives of the United States
Passenger locomotives